A kiss curl describes a lock of hair curling onto the face and usually plastered down. Although the curl could be flattened with saliva (hence its alternative name spit curl), soap or hair lotion was more typically used.

Pre-20th century
In the late seventeenth century there was a fashion for fringes composed of curls described as fripons, guigne-galants, or 'kiss-curls', sometimes augmented with false hair.

20th-century onwards
The kiss-curl was worn by both men and women.

It became a trademark of the singer Bill Haley, who wore a large spit curl over his right eye to divert attention from the other blind eye. Other people who became known for kiss/spit curls included Josephine Baker, Diana Ross, and Superman.

See also
List of hairstyles
Lovelock (hair) braided hair to the side, sometimes on the forehead

References

External links

Human hair
Hairstyles